Boskovich Farms is a historic vegetable producer based in Oxnard, California, U.S. It has operations in California, Arizona and Mexico.

History
The company was founded by ethnic Serbian born in Croatia's Dalmatia region Stephen Boskovich in 1915, shortly after he purchased land from James Boon Lankershim. Boskovich first grew green onions. The company was inherited by his children, followed by his grandchildren.

The company grows "beets, broccoli, Brussels sprouts, cabbage, carrots, celery, chard, cilantro, collards, endive, escarole, fennel, green onions, kale, leaf, leeks, parsley, radish, romaine, and spinach; and apples, banana, bell pepper, onion, tomato" in California and Mexico. Since 2012, it has grown organic vegetables. It ships its produce from its facilities in Salinas, California and Yuma, Arizona.

References

Companies based in Oxnard, California
American companies established in 1915 
Food and drink companies established in 1915 
1915 establishments in California
Agriculture in California
Agriculture in Mexico